Boguegaba Creek is a stream in the U.S. state of Mississippi.

Boguegaba Creek is a name derived from either the Choctaw language or Chickasaw language. A variant name is "Bogue Eucaba Creek". The long-standing traditional local name for the creek is derived from the variant form, pronounced [bˈo͡ʊ jˈuːɡˈæbi].

References

Rivers of Mississippi
Rivers of Itawamba County, Mississippi
Rivers of Lee County, Mississippi
Rivers of Monroe County, Mississippi
Mississippi placenames of Native American origin